Emmanuel Krontiris (born 11 February 1983) is a German former professional footballer who played as a forward.

Career 
Krontiris was born in Hanover. He began his career aged 17 with Tennis Borussia Berlin.

Honours 
 Bundesliga: 2001–02

References

External links 
 
 

1983 births
Living people
German people of Greek descent
German footballers
Footballers from Hanover
Association football forwards
Germany under-21 international footballers
Germany B international footballers
Germany youth international footballers
Bundesliga players
2. Bundesliga players
3. Liga players
Hannover 96 II players
Tennis Borussia Berlin players
Borussia Dortmund players
Borussia Dortmund II players
Alemannia Aachen players
TSV 1860 Munich players
TuS Koblenz players
SpVgg Unterhaching players